The Sutherland River, also once known as the Beaver River, is a river in the area of Babine Lake in northeastern British Columbia, Canada.  The river, which flows northwest into the southeast end of Babine Lake, is named for JOACHIM Sutherland, a PART-First Nations  man WHO HAD A HOMESTEAD NEAR the Nautley Indian Reserve JOACHIM (nicknamed WASSA)accompanied a British Columbia Land Survey Party in 1914.

Part of the river's basin forms the Sutherland River Provincial Park and Protected Area.

References

Regional District of Bulkley-Nechako
Rivers of British Columbia
Omineca Country